Moraxella bovis is a Gram-negative, aerobic, oxidase-positive rod-shaped bacterium. It is the cause of infectious bovine keratoconjunctivitis, a contagious ocular disease of cattle, referred to colloquially  as pinkeye or New Forest eye.  M. bovis was first associated with  pinkeye in cattle 1915 in Bengal, India

The restriction enzyme MboI, widely used in biotechnology, is isolated from this species.

References

External links
Pink-eye in Beef Cattle - Department of Primary Industries
Type strain of Moraxella bovis at BacDive -  the Bacterial Diversity Metadatabase
Culturing pinkeye lesions: Moraxella bovis vs. Moraxella ovis

Moraxellaceae
Gram-negative bacteria
Bovine diseases